Pedro Carvalho (born 8 June 1995), is a Portuguese mixed martial artist currently competing in the Featherweight division of Bellator MMA. As of February 28, 2023, he is #5 in the Bellator Featherweight Rankings.

Background
Carvalho was born in Guimarães, a town in the Braga District of Portugal, with his father abandoning the family three months after his birth. At the age of 12, he decided to become a MMA fighter after seeing UFC ads on TV, even tho there was not an advanced MMA scene in the country at the time. He began training soon after at the gym of Portuguese MMA pioneer, Rafael Silva. Prior to signing with Bellator, Carvalho worked in a factory and also did custodial work for a hospital while fighting on the regional circuit in Portugal, working to save enough money to move to Ireland to train with SBG to help his MMA career take off.

Mixed martial arts career
Carvalho made his professional mixed martial arts debut in September 2012 after turning 17, fighting on the regional scene in Portugal. His first fight came against Edi Vicente, a fight Carvalho won via first-round submission. Carvalho went 7–3 in his career before finally signing with Bellator MMA in 2018.

Bellator MMA
After getting signed to Bellator, Carvalho made his promotional debut against Daniel Crawford at Bellator 200 on 25 May 2018. He won the bout via split decision.

Carvalho next faced Luca Vitali on 1 December 2018 at Bellator 211. He won via guillotine submission just 43 seconds into the first round.

Carvalho faced Bellator veteran Derek Campos on 4 May 2019 at Bellator Birmingham. He was victorious via first-round technical knockout.

After going 3–0 in the promotion, Carvalho entered the Bellator Featherweight World Grand Prix next. In the opening round, Carvalho faced Sam Sicilia at Bellator 226 on 7 September 2019. Carvalho was victorious via first round submission.

In the quarterfinal round of the tournament, Carvalho was expected to face Patrício Freire for the Bellator Featherweight World Championship at Bellator 241 on 13 March 2020. However, the event was cancelled and the bout was put on hold due to the COVID-19 pandemic. The bout will now take place at Bellator 252 on 12 November. Carvalho lost the fight via knockout in the first round.

Carvalho faced Jay Jay Wilson on April 16, 2021, at Bellator 257. At the weigh-ins, Jay Jay Wilson missed weight by .75 pounds and was fined 20% of his purse. He lost the bout a minute into the second round, getting dropped by a spinning backfist and then ground and pound.

Carvalho faced Daniel Weichel at Bellator 270 on November 5, 2021. He won the bout via unanimous decision.

Carvalho was scheduled to face Khasan Askhabov on May 6, 2022, at Bellator 280. However, due to undisclosed reasons, Askhabov was forced to pull out and was replaced by promotional newcomer Piotr Niedzielski. He lost the close bout via split decision.

Carvalho faced Mads Burnell on September 23, 2022, at Bellator 285. He won the bout via unanimous decision.

Carvalho faced Jeremy Kennedy on February 25, 2023, at Bellator 291. He lost the fight by unanimous decision.

Championships and accomplishments
Cage Legacy Fighting Championship
CLFC Lightweight Championship (One time)

Mixed martial arts record

|-
|Loss
|align=center|13–7
|Jeremy Kennedy
|Decision (unanimous)
|Bellator 291
|
|align=center|3
|align=center|5:00
|Dublin, Ireland
|
|-
|Win
|align=center|13–6
|Mads Burnell
|Decision (unanimous)
|Bellator 285
|
|align=center|3
|align=center|5:00
|Dublin, Ireland
|
|-
|Loss
|align=center|12–6
|Piotr Niedzielski
|Decision (split)
|Bellator 280
|
|align=center|3
|align=center|5:00
|Paris, France
|
|-
|Win
|align=center|12–5
|Daniel Weichel
|Decision (unanimous)
|Bellator 270
|
|align=center|3
|align=center|5:00
|Dublin, Ireland
|
|-
|Loss
|align=center|11–5
|Jay Jay Wilson
|TKO (punches)
|Bellator 257
|
|align=center|2
|align=center|0:53
|Uncasville, Connecticut, United States
|
|-
|Loss
|align=center|11–4
|Patrício Freire
|KO (punches)
|Bellator 252
|
|align=center|1
|align=center|2:10
|Uncasville, Connecticut, United States
|
|-
|Win
|align=center|11–3
|Sam Sicilia
|Submission (face crank)
|Bellator 226
|
|align=center|2
|align=center|1:56
|San Jose, California, United States
|
|-
|Win
|align=center| 10–3
|Derek Campos
|TKO (punches)
|Bellator Birmingham
|
|align=center|1
|align=center|2:02
|Birmingham, England 
|
|-
|Win
|align=center| 9–3
|Luca Vitali
|Submission (guillotine choke)
|Bellator 211
|
|align=center|1
|align=center|0:43
|Genoa, Italy 
|
|-
|Win
|align=center| 8–3
|Daniel Crawford
|Decision (split)
|Bellator 200
|
|align=center|3
|align=center|5:00
|London, England 
|
|-
|Win
|align=center| 7–3
|Ibragim Kantaev
|Decision (unanimous)
|CLFC 7
|
|align=center|3
|align=center|5:00
|Drogheda, Ireland 
|
|-
| Win
| align=center| 6–3
| Jeanderson Castro 
| Submission (armbar)
| CLFC 4: Halloween Havoc 
| 
| align=center| 1
| align=center| N/A
| Drogheda, Ireland 
| 
|-
| Loss
| align=center| 5–3
| Adenir Araujo 
| Decision (unanimous)
| International Pro Combat 8 
| 
| align=center| 3
| align=center| 5:00
| Estoril, Portugal
| 
|-
| Loss
| align=center| 5–2
| Wisma Lima
| DQ (knee to downed opponent)
| Pro MMA League 3
| 
| align=center| N/A
| align=center| N/A
| Centro Region, Portugal 
| 
|-
| Win
| align=center| 5–1
| Paulo Fonseca
| Submission 
| Cage Fighters Challengers 3
| 
| align=center| 1
| align=center| 1:36
| Matosinhos, Portugal
| 
|-
| Win
| align=center| 4–1
| Patrick Fernandes
| TKO (head kick and punches)
| MMA Maranus 2014
| 
| align=center| 1
| align=center| 1:42
| Amarante, Portugal
| 
|-
| Win
| align=center| 3–1
| Bruno Borges 
| Decision (split)
| Invictus Pro MMA League 1
| 
| align=center| 3
| align=center| 5:00
| Porto, Portugal
|
|-
| Loss
| align=center| 2–1
| Artur Lemos 
| Submission (rear-naked choke)
| CF Cage Fighters 3
| 
| align=center| 1
| align=center| 3:25
| Matosinhos, Portugal
|
|-
| Win
| align=center| 2–0
| Luis Veracruz
| Submission (rear-naked choke)
| Showfight 14 
| 
| align=center| 1
| align=center| 2:59
| Estoril, Portugal
|
|-
| Win
| align=center| 1–0
| Edi Vicente
| Submission (rear-naked choke)
| WUFC 2012 Second Round 
| 
| align=center| 1
| align=center| N/A
| Viseu, Portugal
|
|-

See also
 List of current Bellator fighters
 List of male mixed martial artists

References

1995 births
Living people
Bellator male fighters
Portuguese male mixed martial artists